Samuel "Sammy" Blais (born June 17, 1996) is a Canadian professional ice hockey forward for the St Louis Blues of the National Hockey League (NHL). He was drafted by the Blues in the sixth round, 176th overall, in the 2014 NHL Entry Draft, and has also played for the New York Rangers.

He played junior ice hockey with Trois-Rivières Estacades and Lévis Commandeurs in the Quebec Junior AAA Hockey League (QMAAA) before entering the Quebec Major Junior Hockey League (QMJHL). He split his time between the Commandeurs and the Victoriaville Tigres before being selected 176th overall by the St. Louis Blues in the 2014 NHL Entry Draft. Blais spent three seasons in the QMJHL, the latter portion with the Charlottetown Islanders, before making his professional debut with the Chicago Wolves during the 2016–17 season.

Carrying his scoring touch from juniors, Blais helped the Wolves reach the postseason in his rookie year before eventually making his NHL debut on October 14, 2017. During his early years with the Blues organization, Blais alternated between the San Antonio Rampage and St. Louis consistently, resulting in hockey pundits to joking refer to the highway between the two cities as the Sammy Blais Expressway. As a member of the Blues, Blais helped the team win their first Stanley Cup in franchise history in 2019.

Early life
Blais was born on June 17, 1996, in Montmagny, Quebec to parents Sébastien and Marie-Josée and siblings Étienne and Florence. His older brother Étienne also plays hockey and last played for the Montmagny Décor Mercier in the Ligue Hockey Côte-Sud. Growing up, he played summer hockey with future NHL player Daniel Sprong until they were 10 or 11 years old.

Playing career
Blais began his junior ice hockey career playing with the Rive-Sud Express in Quebec, where he recorded 10 goals with 16 assists in 23 regular season games. He played in the 2008 and 2009 Quebec International Pee-Wee Hockey Tournaments with the Rive-Sud Est and later Rimouski. During the summer of 2012, Blais attended the Lévis Commandeurs training camp but failed to make the jump to AAA midget. As this was his second time failing to make the final roster, Blais stated he "thought it was the end of my hockey career." Instead, he caught the attention of general manager Frédéric Lavoie of Trois-Rivières Estacades who, after listening to praise from his assistant Pascal Luneau and scout Jean-Philippe Glaude, signed him to their team. Blais competed with the Trois-Rivieres during the 2012–13 season, where he recorded 16 goals and 24 assists to help them qualify for the Quebec Junior AAA Hockey League (QMAA) playoffs.

Blais was originally selected 129th overall in the 2013 Quebec Major Junior Hockey League Entry Draft by the Victoriaville Tigres but was reassigned to the Commandeurs out of the Tigres' training camp. At the time of his draft selection, Blais stood at 5'9 but was praised for having "undeniable potential for development." After spending the remainder of the 2013–14 season split between the Commandeurs and the Tigres, Blais was chosen in his first year of eligibility by the St. Louis Blues in the sixth round, 176th overall, of the 2014 NHL Entry Draft. Blais was unaware he had been drafted and only learned through Twitter. He impressed the coaches during the Blues' Development Camp during the summer and earned an invitation to their training camp in September.

Blais rejoined the Tigres for the 2014–15 season where he posted a career high 82 points in 61 games. After losing in the playoffs, Blais signed an Amateur Tryout Agreement (ATO) with the St. Louis Blues' American Hockey League (AHL) affiliate, the Chicago Wolves, on April 22, 2015. He was eventually released from his contract, and attended the Blues' Prospect Camp in July. He rejoined the Tigres for his final junior season where he led the team in scoring. By November 14, 2015, Blais was signed to a three-year entry-level contract with the St. Louis Blues. He produced 40 points in 30 games before he was dealt by the Tigres to the Charlottetown Islanders on December 20, 2015.

Upon his arrival with the Islanders, Blais continued his scoring prowess and spent time on their penalty kill. Blais continued his offensive output in leading the Islanders to finish with a combined 82 points in just 63 games. His scoring helped lead the Islanders to the QMJHL Quarter-finals against the Shawinigan Cataractes, where they lost in six games. At the conclusion of the season, Blais was nominated for the teams' Offensive Player of the Year Award and Three Stars Award. When reflecting on his years playing junior hockey, Blais has stated "I was not really a physical player....But when I came into pro hockey, ‘Chief’ (Berube) told me I was a big guy, I could use my shoulders more. I started doing it, and I think it was another aspect to my game. When I started using it, I became a better player. I think that’s why I’m in the NHL today."

Professional

St. Louis Blues
Embarking on his professional career, Blais was assigned by the St. Louis Blues to American Hockey League (AHL) affiliate, the Chicago Wolves, for the 2016–17 season. He recorded two shots on goal during his AHL debut on October 14, 2016, against the Grand Rapids Griffins and consistently played on a line with Magnus Paajarvi and Wade Megan. While with this pairing, he recorded his first professional goal on November 5, in a 4–2 win over the Griffins. Blais carried over his scoring ability from junior to lead the Wolves in scoring with 26 goals in 75 games. He helped the team qualify for the 2017 Calder Cup playoffs, where they lost in five games to the Griffins in the Central Division Finals.

After attending the Blues training camp the following summer, Blais with a strong showing was potentially earmarked to make NHL roster for the 2017–18 season. He played with the Blues for their preseason games, during which he was hit from behind by Washington Capitals forward Tom Wilson. This resulted in Wilson receiving a five-minute major, a game misconduct, and a hearing with the NHL Department of Player Safety. However, he was among the Blues final cuts and was reassigned to open the season with the San Antonio Rampage of the AHL. After playing in two games with the Rampage, Blais received his first call-up to the NHL, forcing him to travel cross-country and arrive in Tampa Bay. He made his NHL debut that night on October 14, 2017, in a 2–1 defeat to the Tampa Bay Lightning and recorded his first career NHL goal on November 26, to help the Blues win 6–3 over the Minnesota Wild. While playing with the Blues on December 16, against the Winnipeg Jets, he suffered a lower body injury and missed two weeks to recover. Upon his return to the lineup on January 5, he was re-assigned to the Rampage. He played in the AHL alongside Tage Thompson and Zach Sanford before being recalled for the fifth time to the NHL level on February 19, 2018. Overall, Blais alternated between San Antonio and St. Louis six times throughout the season, resulting in some reporters to joking refer to the highway between the two cities as the Sammy Blais Expressway.

Blais was once again invited to the St. Louis Blues training camp prior to the 2018–19 season, and recorded four goals in four games during their pre-season games. His efforts were noticed and he cracked the Blues' opening night roster against the Winnipeg Jets. His assignment was shortlived as he was reassigned to the Rampage on October 23, 2018, after playing in eight games. He spent nine games at the AHL level, registering two goals and 16 penalty minutes, before earning a recall to the NHL. Once again, Blais spent the season alternating between the AHL and NHL as the Blues qualified for the 2019 Stanley Cup playoffs. Blais made his playoffs debut in Game 6 of the Second Round of the Western Conference and recorded his first NHL playoff goal to push the series to seven games. Blais and the St. Louis Blues eventually won the 2019 Stanley Cup Final against the Boston Bruins, to bring St. Louis their first Stanley Cup in franchise history.

Blais was one of the many members of the Blues' Stanley Cup winning team who returned to their opening night roster for the 2019–20 season. He impressed coach Craig Berube at the beginning of the season and was assigned a top line position alongside David Perron and Ryan O'Reilly. After playing in 20 games and recording eight points, Blais missed 10 weeks to recover from wrist surgery as a result of an injury suffered during a 3–1 win over the Tampa Bay Lightning. He returned to the Blues lineup on January 28, 2020, for a game against the Calgary Flames, after missing 28 games. While the NHL was suspended due to COVID-19, he signed a two-year, $3 million contract extension with the Blues.

When the NHL returned for the 2020–21 season, Blais made the Blues' opening night roster against the Colorado Avalanche. During the first game of the season, Blais illegally checked Devon Toews's head and was subsequently given a two-minute penalty for elbowing. Following the game, Blais was suspended for two games and forfeited $25,862.06 to the Players' Emergency Assistance Fund.

New York Rangers
On July 23, 2021, Blais was traded, along with a 2022 second-round pick, to the New York Rangers in exchange for Pavel Buchnevich. He registered four assists in 14 games before suffering a torn anterior cruciate ligament (ACL) on November 15 against the New Jersey Devils following a dangerous collision with P. K. Subban. Blais was ruled out for the remainder of the 2021–22 season.

Return to St. Louis
On February 9, 2023, Blais was traded back to the Blues as part of a package for former teammates Niko Mikkola and Vladimir Tarasenko. On March 2, Blais was signed to a one-year contract extension.

Career statistics

Awards and honours

References

External links
 

1996 births
Living people
Canadian ice hockey left wingers
Charlottetown Islanders players
Chicago Wolves players
Hartford Wolf Pack players
Ice hockey people from Quebec
New York Rangers players
San Antonio Rampage players
St. Louis Blues draft picks
St. Louis Blues players
Stanley Cup champions
Victoriaville Tigres players
People from Montmagny, Quebec